The Book of Fish is a 2021 South Korean historical black and white film directed by Lee Joon-ik. The film starring Sol Kyung-gu and Byun Yo-han, is about an exiled Joseon era scholar and a fisherman and their exchange of knowledge in writing a book. The film was theatrically released on March 31, 2021 by Megabox.

According to Korean Film Council data, it is at 14th place among all the Korean films released in the year 2021 in South Korea, with gross of US$2.70 million and 342,540 admissions, .

The film won the Grand Prize at 57th Baeksang Arts Awards in May 2021. It has won 20 awards overall at various award ceremonies.

Synopsis
The Book of Fish is a black-and-white historical film set in 1801 about the Joseon era scholar Jeong Yak-jeon (1758–1816) (Sol Kyung-gu). He was exiled to Heuksando Island during the Catholic Persecution of 1801 in King Sunjo of Joseon’s reign. There he wrote a pishine encyclopaedia titled Jasaneobo. In the film a fictional character Chang-dae (Byun Yo-han), a young, conservative and eager to learn fisherman is introduced.

Cast
 Sol Kyung-gu as Jeong Yak-jeon
 Byun Yo-han as Jang Chang-dae
 Lee Jung-eun as woman from Gageo
 Min Do-hee as Bok-rye
 Cha Soon-bae as Poong-heon
 Kang Ki-young as Lee Kang-hwe
 Dong Bang-woo as Magistrate of Naju 
 Jung Jin-young as King Jeongjo
 Kim Eui-sung as Official Jang
 Bang Eun-jin as Changdae's mother
 Ryu Seung-ryong as Jeong Yakyong
 Jo Woo-jin as Byeol-jang
 Choi Won-young as Jeong Yak-jong
 Yoon Kyung-ho as Moon Soon-deuk
 Jo Seung-yeon as Yi Byeok

Production
The Book of Fish is a black and white film, which are making a comeback in South Korea.

Filming
Filming was wrapped up on November 15, 2019.

Release
The film was theatrically released on March 31, 2021 by Megabox.

The Book of Fish has been invited at the 20th New York Asian Film Festival. It was featured in 'Standouts’ strand and screened at Lincoln Center and SVA Theatre in the two-week festival held from August 6 to 22, 2021 in New York. It was also selected in 'Korean Cinema Today - Panorama Section' at 26th Busan International Film Festival and will be screened in the festival in October 2021. The film was also screened at 10th Korean Film Festival Frankfurt on October 23, 2021. On May 6, 2022, it was screened at the Habitat International Film Festival (HIFF), at the Habitat Center in New Delhi.

In 2022, it was selected as one of the films in 'The Actor, Sol Kyung-gu' special exhibition event at 26th Bucheon International Fantastic Film Festival to honour actor Sol Kyung-gu.

Reception

Box office
The film released on March 31, 2021 on 1250 screens. It was at the number 1 place at the Korean box office by collecting 54,000 audiences on the weekend, taking its total commutative audience to 255,000 persons in the second week of its release.

According to Korean Film Council data, it is at 14th place among all the Korean films released in the year 2021, with gross of US$2.71 million and 342,540 admissions, .
 The system of KOBIS (Korean Box Office Information System) is managed by KOFIC.

Critical response

Going by Korean review aggregator Naver Movie Database, the film holds an approval rating of 9.11 from the audience. 

Kim Boram reviewing The Book of Fish for Yonhap wrote that the film keeps interest of the viewers alive as the tone is not serious. He opined that the beautiful scenery of Heuksando Island makes the viewing pleasurable. He praised the performances of Sol Kyung-gu as an open-minded scholar and Byun Yo-han as Chang-dae, a young but conservative fisherman. Concluding the review Boram said, "The black-and-white cinematography makes the movie feel like a Joseon Dynasty ink painting, .... and the viewers even get the sense that color is not really important in the script-driven and performance-based piece."

Awards and nominations

References

External links
 
 
 
 

2020s Korean-language films
South Korean historical drama films
South Korean biographical drama films
South Korean black-and-white films
Films postponed due to the COVID-19 pandemic
2021 films
Films about Catholicism
Films about marine biology
Films about fish
Films about fishers
Films about writers
Films about teacher–student relationships
Films set in South Jeolla Province
Films set on islands
Films set in 1801
Films set in the 1800s
Films set in the 1810s
Films directed by Lee Joon-ik
Films set in the Joseon dynasty
2020s historical drama films
South Korean films based on actual events